The AMC Matador is a car model line that was manufactured and marketed by American Motors Corporation (AMC) across two generations, 1971–1973 (mid-size) and 1974–1978 (full-size), in two-door hardtop (first generation) and coupe (second generation) versions as well as in four-door sedan and station wagon body styles.

The first generation Matador was focused on the "family" market segment and was also offered in performance versions as highlighted in the NASCAR racing series with factory support from 1972 through 1975. Several TV shows—portraying both true-life, day-to-day operations of police work as well as in fictional stories—featured Matadors that were common in police fleets.

With its second generation, the Matador became AMC's largest automobile after the Ambassador, which shared the same platform, was discontinued after the 1974 model year. Premium trim levels of the second generation Matador coupe were marketed as the Barcelona and Oleg Cassini (after the noted fashion designer) positioning the coupe in the personal luxury segment.

Abroad, Matadors were also marketed under the Rambler marque and were assembled under license in Costa Rica, Mexico by Vehículos Automotores Mexicanos (VAM), and Australia by Australian Motor Industries (AMI). Matadors were also marketed in overseas markets that included exports of right-hand drive versions to the UK.

Background 
The 1971 Matador replaced the AMC Rebel, which had been marketed since 1967. With a facelift and a new name, the AMC Matadors were available as a two-door hardtop, four-door sedan, and station wagon body styles. The Matador shared a modified platform with the full-size Ambassador line. Although related directly to the previous Rebel models, AMC began promoting the Matador as more than a change in name with a slight facelift, to reposition the line in the highly competitive intermediate-car segment among consumers. The advertising campaign was built around the question "What's a Matador?"

Sedan and wagon models "offered excellent value and were fairly popular" cars. Matadors were also offered to fleet buyers with various police, taxicab, and other heavy-duty packages. They outperformed most other cars and "was adopted as the official police car." Matadors with heavy-duty police equipment were produced from 1971 through 1975. They continued to be in service longer than normal because of favorable field reports.

The Matador received a redesign in 1974, in part to meet new safety and crash requirements. The most significant change was to the two-door version. The hardtop was the slowest-selling body style in the Matador line although it was in a market segment where two-door models were typically the most popular - and also most profitable. As a result, the boxy two-door hardtop body design was replaced with a completely different and sleeker coupe model "to contend with the bull market for plush mid-size coupes that sprang up after the end of the muscle car era". It also featured a design that was praised by owners along with their complaints about its low roofline. The design of the Matador coupe has been described as "polarizing" as well as being "an evocative, swoopy coupe that perfectly captured the design ethos of the era."

Factory-backed first-generation hardtops and second-generation coupes competed in NASCAR stock car racing from 1972 through 1975. Drivers included Mark Donohue and Bobby Allison winning several races including the 1975 Southern 500 at Darlington. The AMC Matador captured five first-place wins.

Matadors in police livery were featured in television shows and movies during the 1970s. The Matador coupe was a featured car and also a scale model of it was used as a flying car in The Man with the Golden Gun, a James Bond film released in 1974.

First generation

1971 

Matadors for 1971 received a revised front styling for all body styles, sharing its body design from the firewall rearward with the Ambassador and the same platform. Revisions included a longer wheelbase and updated front styling, grille, and chrome trim. The new Matador was available in four-door sedan, two-door hardtop (no B pillar), and four-door station wagon body styles.

The 1971 model retained the same trunk lid chrome strip and rear-corner chrome garnishes as on the 1970 models. New was a rear bumper with revised rounded-square lenses; interior dash, instrument cluster, steering wheel, and armrests; and the 1967–1970 Rebel "Weather Eye" fan-heat control unit.

As a restyled 1970 Rebel, advertising suggested the Matador was not just a name change and facelift. The new nameplate distanced the car from connotations of social unrest, and the "what's a Matador" advertising campaign established a distinct marketing identity for the car. This self-disparaging marketing campaign "turned the styling of anonymity into an asset." Consumer-research polls conducted by AMC found it meant virility and excitement to consumers. American Motors ran into problems in Puerto Rico, where the term "matador" retained a bullfighting "killer" connotation.

Station wagons offered optional rear-facing third-row bench seats, increasing seating from six to eight passengers. Standard equipment included a roof rack as well as a two-way tailgate so that with the rear window retracted could be opened downward using a center-mounted release handle engaging the bottom-mounted hinges thus extending the load surface, or swing open door-like when using the handle on the right side that engaged the hinges on the left side of the tailgate.

The Matador came with a straight-6 or one of several available V8 engines. Transmissions for the Matador included the Borg-Warner sourced "Shift-Command" three-speed automatic, a column-shifted three-speed manual, and a floor-shifted four-speed manual.

Machine Go package
The traditional muscle car market segment was sharply decreasing in 1971, with ever-higher insurance rates and ever-more power-robbing changes required on engines forced to operate on lower octane lead-free gasoline. Combined, it was enough to force AMC to discontinue its high-performance Rebel Machine model after just one year. Instead, an optional "Machine Go package" of performance enhancements was offered as an option, not a model designation, for the 1971 Matador two-door hardtop. It included many of those the Rebel Machine had had, with others were available individually, but without any specific "Machine" designation, badges, or marketing. The only engines available with the Go package were the  V8 (an additional $373 option) and the newly introduced , AMC's largest engine ($461 extra). Red-white-blue striping as offered on the Rebel Machine was not available, nor was its standard factory-installed ram air hood scoop. No specific transmissions or shifters were included.

What did come with the "Machine Go" package were 15x7 "slot-style" wheels, L60x15 raised white lettering Goodyear Polyglas tires, a Space-Saver spare, power disc brakes, and a "handling package" that included heavy-duty springs, shocks, and rear sway bar. Dual exhaust was standard if the optional 401 V8 was purchased, but an extra charge with the base 360. A "Twin-Grip" differential was optional, but recommended with the performance package, required if an optional 3.91 rear end was purchased.

Approximately 50 Matadors with the "Machine Go" package were produced for the 1971 model year.

1972 
The 1972 Matador was positioned as a "family car" and continued with a few changes in sedan, two-door hardtop, and as a station wagon with two or three rows of seats. The  I6 was standard on sedans and the hardtop with the wagon including the  I6 engine as standard. A three-speed column manual transmission was standard with the I6 engines. The previous Borg-Warner sourced "Shift-Command" three-speed automatic transmission was replaced by the Chrysler-built TorqueFlite three-speed automatic that AMC marketed as "Torque-Command". The optional four-speed manual was discontinued. All engines were designed to use no lead, low octane gasoline and featured new rocker arms and bearings for quiet valve train operation.

The 1972 model year introduced AMC's innovative "Buyer Protection Plan" to address increasing consumer demands. This was the automobile industry's first 12-month or  bumper-to-bumper warranty. American Motors started with an emphasis on quality and durability by focusing on its component sourcing, improving production that included reducing the number of models, as well as mechanical upgrades and increasing the level of standard equipment. This was followed by an innovative promise to its customers to repair anything wrong with the car (except for tires). Owners were provided with a toll-free number to the company, as well as a free loaner car if a warranty repair took overnight. The objective was to reduce warranty claims, as well as achieve better public relations along with greater customer satisfaction and loyalty. This "revolutionary" coverage was evaluated as successful by AMC dealers to bring buyers into the showroom, provide a sales tool that other brands did not offer, as well as the cars' quality resulted in improved ownership satisfaction.

Externally the 1972 models were the same as the 1971 versions retaining the same front end, but now with a simplified grille design. The chrome trunk lid strip and rear corner chrome found on the 1970 Rebels and 1971 Matadors was dropped. The 1972 model was given a new tail light lens assembly with each assembly divided into nine recessed vertically rectangular lenses. Interior-wise the 1972 model saw the return of the round instrument dials of earlier Ambassador and 1967 Rebel models. The steering wheel was the same as the 1970 Rebel and 1971 Matador models. New for the 1972 model were slimmer armrests for the doors and a bench seat without the fold-down center armrests. Individual reclining front seats were an option for all body styles with bucket seats and center armrest available on the hardtops.

Production of 1972 Matadors included 36,899 sedans, 10,448 station wagons, and 7,306 pillar-less hardtops.

1973 
The Matador hardtop, sedan, and station wagon body styles came in only one trim model for 1973, with numerous appearance and comfort options. The 1973 model year brought new U.S. National Highway Traffic Safety Administration (NHTSA) regulations that required all passenger cars to withstand a  front and a  rear impacts without damage to the engine, lights, and safety equipment. Matadors gained stronger front and rear bumpers. The front bumper included self-restoring telescoping shock absorbers and more prominent vertical rubber guards, while the rear bumper gained vertical black rubber bumper guards that replaced a pair of similar and previously optional chrome bumper guards. Aside from the changes to the bumpers, the design of the 1973 model was identical to the 1972 model except for new tail light lens assemblies and a slightly different grille pattern. The dash and instrument cluster of the 1972 model was repeated in the 1973 model although the steering wheel horn pad no longer included a "bullseye" emblem, which had been in use since the last year of the Rebel models. The full-width bench seat was standard with 50/50 individually adjustable and reclining seats were optional on all body styles. The station wagons came with "Uganda" vinyl upholstery, while the two-door hardtops offered optional front bucket seats.

All V8-powered Matadors came with a TorqueFlite 998 automatic transmission and a column-mounted shifter. The V8 Autolite 2100 carburetor was replaced with the modified Motorcraft 2150 carburetor. The  I6 was the base engine with a column-mounted three-speed manual transmission, with a  I6 optional, with which only the station wagon could be ordered with a manual transmission because almost all six-cylinder powered Matadors came with TorqueFlite 904 automatics.

Promotional and publicity efforts for the Matador included sponsorship at NASCAR racing events. Mark Donohue drove a two-door hardtop prepared by Roger Penske on the road course at Riverside, California, on 21 January 1973, lapping the entire field to win this NASCAR Cup Series race. This was also Penske's first NASCAR victory at the Winston Western 500, with Donohue's Matador leading 138 out of the 191 laps.

A comparison of 1973 Matador owners conducted by Popular Mechanics indicated increased satisfaction and fewer problems than was the case with the owners of the essentially similar 1970 AMC Rebel three years earlier.

The intermediate-sized car market segment was growing to almost 20% of the total market by 1973, but the hardtop was the slowest-selling version in the Matador line, "in a segment where two-door hardtops were customarily the most popular (and profitable) models." Automobile Quarterly reviewed the 1973 cars and summarized that "AMC actually has a very strong product line, but public awareness of it seems so feeble as to be negligible. ... The Matador became a typical intermediate, an exact counterpart of the Satellite/Coronet or Torino/Montego", and ranked AMC's car as a "good buy."

Second generation 

American Motors was facing many challenges in a dynamic marketplace. The strategy to redesign the Matador for the 1974 model year was an example of the changes that Gerald C. Meyers, vice president of product development, wanted for AMC's mid-sized product range. The intermediate-sized cars were best sellers in the U.S. and the two-door hardtops or coupe versions most popular with consumers. Because styling was their greatest selling point, a decision was made to develop a new version of the Matador as a coupe, thus giving designers the freedom to style "rakishly as sheet metal could be made to look" and eliminating the limits of making sedans and station wagons with the same lines.

The results were introduced with the 1974 model year Matadors. Four-door sedans and station wagons featured major front-end changes. The rear end on the four-door sedans was revised. In contrast, the two-door model became a separate and radically styled pillared coupe. All models included new interiors and paint colors. The previous hardtop design was discontinued and the new two-door coupe no longer shared any body parts with the sedan or wagon. The coupe's roofline was significantly lower and its wheelbase was  shorter compared to the four-door Matadors. These are considered to be the "second generation" Matadors.

1974 

New passenger car requirements set by NHTSA called for the front and rear passenger car bumpers to have uniform heights, take angle impacts, and sustain  impacts with no damage. All the 1974 Matadors accomplished this with massive front and rear bumpers mounted on energy-absorbing shocks. The sedans and station wagons had them integrated with the bodywork using gap-concealing flexible filler panels.

The four-door sedans and wagons had increased overall vehicle length, as well as new front and rear styling. A new front fascia with a hood and grille featured a prominent central protrusion that followed the front bumper shape. Matadors with this front end are sometimes nicknamed "coffin noses". The rear of the sedan was redesigned with the license plate was relocated above the number to the center of the rear panel with new, wider rectangular taillights. The station wagon had redesigned taillamps and a stronger bumper with a central rubber facing.

The interior of all body styles featured an all-new fully padded and safety-shaped dashboard with three squared pods for housing the instruments in front of the driver (indicator lights, fuel gauge, and water temperature to the left,  speedometer at the center, and an electric clock or fuel economy gauge on the right) as well as a new horizontal radio/sound system design in the center of the dash. The traditional steering wheel horn pad in use since the 1970 Rebel was replaced with a rectangular "soft feel horn bar."

Second-generation sedans and station wagons continued over all the model years with only minor trim and equipment changes.

The base model sedans and wagons came with the  I6 with the 3-speed Torque-Command automatic transmission. The  V8 was optional. A two-barrel or four-barrel  was optional as well as a  V8 with dual exhausts. The  V8 became a fleet-only option after 1974.

A road test by automobile journalist Vincent Courtenay of the 1974 Matador station wagon "praised its performance, handling, and fuel economy considering its size and 360 CID engine." He described it as "a real sleeper on the market. Its performance ranks it in the first line of cars, yet it's reasonably priced."

1975 

Changes for the 1975 model year were minor as AMC focused on the development and introduction of its innovative Pacer, but Matadors now included a standard "no maintenance" electronic ignition developed by Prestolite. All U.S. market Matadors featured catalytic converters that required the use of unleaded regular-grade fuel. New "unleaded fuel only" decals were placed by the fuel filler door and on the fuel gauge. Steel-belted radial tires became standard equipment on all Matadors.

The six-cylinder engine now became the  version and it was not available in California. From 1975 the 360 and 401 V8s were fitted with the upgraded Autolite 4350 4-barrel carburetor. Only V8-powered Matadors were available in California.

The sedan and wagon exteriors were updated with a new full-width grille featuring squared-off parking lights in the front and a new tail light lens assembly. An uplevel "Brougham" trim option became available for both sedans and wagons from 1975. There were no further style changes to the body of the sedan and wagon for the remainder of the production run.

A preview of the 1975 Matador models by the editors of Consumer Guide was quite complimentary, especially of the sedan and wagon.

1976 

 
For 1976 the  six-cylinder remained the base engine with  V8 and  V8 engines with 2-barrel carburetor as options.

A "Performance Option"  V8 with 4-barrel carburetor and dual exhaust with twin catalytic converters was available through 1976. The 2.87 rear axle ratio was standard with 3.15 and 3.54 optional. A floor-shifted automatic transmission was available on coupes equipped with bucket seats and a console.

The "Brougham" trim option continued for both sedans and wagons in 1976.

1977 

All 1977 Matadors included enhanced comfort, trim, and convenience equipment as factory standard. Among them were automatic transmission, power steering, power disc brakes, full wheel covers as well as individually adjustable and reclining front seats. Standard were fully color-coordinated interiors with plaid patterned fabrics or full vinyl upholstery. Plush carpet was also in the cargo area of stations wagons that featured chrome strips on the load floor to ease loading items.

For 1977 AMC introduced the Buyer Protection Plan II which extended the engine and drivetrain warranty from 12-months/12,000 miles to 24-months/24,000 miles.

The base engines continued to be the  I6 and the  V8 with the  optional. The high-performance "Power Package" 360 was dropped for 1977.

The domestic automakers had begun the process and downsizing their models in response to changing market demands, but AMC continued its body design with the result that the six-cylinder Matador now weighed  more - along with having less interior room - than a new large-sized six-cylinder Pontiac.

1978 
All Matador sedans and station wagons came in the Brougham trim level, but without any exterior identification. The "Barcelona" option that was previously exclusive to the Matador Coupe was extended to the four-door sedan. This special trim package included velveteen crush fabric upholstery on the individually reclining front seats, vinyl roof, and coordination of colors both inside and outside. The Barcelona sedan came in a choice of two two-tone color schemes: Golden Ginger Metallic on Sand Tan with a tan interior, or Autumn Red metallic on Claret metallic with a claret interior. Additional features included woven accent stripes on the seats as well as on custom door trim panels, a unique headliner,  carpeting, dual color-matched remotely adjustable rearview mirrors, 15-inch slot-styled road wheels color-matched to the two exterior color schemes, GR78x15 whitewall tires, and black trunk carpeting.

All station wagons included the   V8 as standard.

The AMC Buyer Protection Plan for 1978 reverted to 12-months or  coverage across the entire AMC range.

In 1978, sales of the Matador fell by two-thirds and AMC proceeded to drop the line by the end of the model year.

Matador Coupe 

American Motors' executives saw an opportunity to replace the "uninspired" Matador two-door hardtop with a new design to capture people looking for exciting, sporty styling in a market segment that was outpacing the rest of the automobile market; and were looking to answer the demand for plush mid-size coupes after the end of the muscle car era.

The 1974 model year introduced an aerodynamically styled fastback coupe with pronounced "tunneled" headlight surrounds. The Matador coupe was the only all-new model in the popular mid-size car segment, specifically targeting the Chevrolet Chevelle Coupe, Ford Torino Coupe, and Plymouth Satellite Sebring. The coupe was designed under the direction of AMC's vice president of styling, Dick Teague, with input from Mark Donohue, the famous race car driver. AMC's styling department had greater freedom because of a decision to design the new Matador strictly as a coupe, without the constraints of attempting to have the sedan and station wagon versions fit the same body lines. 

Teague reportedly designed the coupe's front as an homage to one of the first AMCs he designed, the 1964 Rambler American. This was one of several distinctive elements as the long sloping hood was set off by deeply tunneled headlamps between a broad grille with turn signal lamps resembling driving lamps. The forward edge of the hood was part of a character crease line that went completely around the middle of the car and continued across the rear end. The coupe's doors were extra long and featured frameless glass. The B-pillar was also distinctive and the quarter side windows sloped with the roofline. The combination of a very long low hood and a tall short rear deck enhanced the coupe's wind-shaped look. The new coupe featured a totally unique design to avoid the massive, blockish look. The bodywork flowed underneath the coupe's broad grille with tunneled headlamps in the rear with an uninterrupted design with the four round taillamps and an indented license plate area, while the bumpers were free-standing with rubber gaiters concealing the retractable shock absorbers.

The standard power team for the 1974 coupe was AMC's  inline six-cylinder with a 3-speed manual transmission. Standard on the Matador X was the  V8. A floor shift automatic transmission was available only on the coupe with a center console and bucket front seats.

Many were amazed that AMC came up with the fast, stylish Matador, considering the automaker's size and limited resources. The Matador coupe stands out as one of the more distinctive and controversial designs of the 1970s after the AMC Pacer and was named "Best Styled Car of 1974" by the editors of Car and Driver magazine. A Popular Mechanics survey indicated "luscious looks of Matador coupe swept most owners off their feet" with a "specific like" listed by 63.7% of them for "styling".

Sales of the coupe were brisk with 62,629 Matador coupes delivered for its introductory year (August 1973 thru December 1974, Long Year), up sharply from the 7,067 Matador hardtops sold in 1973. This is a respectable record that went against the drop in the overall market during 1974 and the decline in popularity of intermediate-sized coupes after the 1973 oil crisis.

The 1974 coupe was also a milestone car for American Motors by being the six millionth automobile built by AMC since its formation from the merger of Nash and Hudson in 1954.

A new grille for the coupe was introduced for the 1976 model year. Two rectangular panels with horizontal grille bars met in the center and rectangular park and turn signal lamps replaced the previous round ones.

After the coupe outsold the four-door Matadors by nearly 25,000 units in 1974, sales dropped to less than 10,000 in 1977, and then down to just 2,006 in the coupe's final year. Nearly 100,000 Matador coupes in total were produced from 1974 through 1978.

American Motors executives, including vice president of design Dick Teague, described design plans for a four-door sedan and station wagon based on the coupe's styling themes that did not reach production.

Oleg Cassini 

A special Oleg Cassini edition of the Matador coupe was available for the 1974 and 1975 model years. It positioned in the mid-sized personal luxury car market segment that was highly popular during the mid-1970s. The Cassini Matador was the latest in a series of designer cars marketed by AMC from a program launched in 1971 when AMC signed contracts with selected top names in the fashion world. The Cassini model followed the Gucci Hornet and Pierre Cardin Javelin special designs, as well as the Levi's package of the Gremlin and Hornet. American Motors had the famous American fashion designer develop an elegant luxury-oriented and haute couture design for the all-new Matador coupe.

Cassini was renowned in Hollywood and high-society for making elegant ready-to-wear dresses, including those worn by Jacqueline Kennedy. According to Dick Teague, the automaker's vice president of styling, AMC wanted to target mid-size car buyers aged 25 to 35 and marketing studies showed that Cassini was a "fashion authority whose name was familiar in America" as his name was at the top of consumer recognition lists. Cassini himself helped promote the car in AMC's advertising.

This was also the first time in AMC's designer models where the fashion expert influenced both the interior and exterior details with the objective "for the entire car to emphasize a carefully wrought harmony of colors, trim and fabrics." With Cassini's styling, the new "smooth and slippery" two-door featured "marks of haute couture" with the "upholstery, panels and headliner done in jet black, with copper trim pieces, and with carpets and vinyl roof also offered in a copper accent color. The exterior trim included striping, bodyside rub strips, custom wheel covers, and special "Oleg Cassini" crest badging." The Cassini coupes were limited to black, white, or copper metallic exterior paints, and all came with the vinyl-covered roof. They also featured copper-colored trim in the grille, headlamp bezels, within the standard turbine-type full wheel covers, and also within the rear license plate recess.

The interior was a Cassini hallmark featuring a special black fabric with copper metal buttons on the individual adjustable and reclining front seats as well as on the padded door panels. The design was further enhanced by deep pile copper-colored carpeting. Additional copper accents were on the steering wheel, door pulls, and on the instrument panel. Embroidered Cassini medallions were featured on the headrests. The glove compartment door, trunk lid, front fender, and hood featured Cassini's signature.

The Cassini version generated publicity along with showroom traffic for AMC dealers and a total of 6,165 Cassinis were built during the 1974 model year with another 1,817 versions for 1975. Changes for 1975 were minimal such as using AMC's new standard steering wheel design with a softer cover and tapered spokes. The Cassini luxury designer model was supplanted for the 1976 model year with the "Barcelona" version that was designed by AMC's in-house staff. This new model took the Matador to a whole other level of being a "mini-Mark IV, but with none of the prestige."

The use of a fashion designer to specially create appearance packages for American cars was followed by the Continental Mark IV in 1976. In 1979, Cadillac briefly used this approach on the Cadillac Seville partnering with fashion designer Gucci, but ended this practice in 1980.

Barcelona 

For 1977 and 1978, the "Barcelona II" coupe featured a padded Landau roof and opera windows, styling cues that were favored at that time by buyers in the highly popular two-door "personal luxury" market segment. At first, it was available in only one distinctive two-tone paint pattern consisting of Golden Ginger Metallic with Sand Tan.

The Barcelona included numerous comfort and appearance upgrades in addition to the extensive standard equipment that came on all Matadors. The special items were: individual reclining seats in velveteen crush fabric with woven accent stripes, custom door trim panels, unique headliner,  carpeting, special "Barcelona" medallion on glove box door and front fenders, two-tone paint, headlight bezels painted accent color, two-tone finished 15-inch slot styled wheels, body-colored front and rear bumpers with rubber guards and nerf strips, landau padded vinyl roof, opera quarter windows with accents, dual remote control mirrors painted body color, black trunk carpet, rear sway bar, GR78x15 radial whitewall tires. The standard roll-down rear quarter windows were converted into fixed "opera windows" with fiberglass covers over the stock openings that were finished with padded vinyl inside and out.

For the 1978 model year, the Barcelona package came in a second color scheme: an Autumn Red Metallic on Claret Metallic combination. The 258-cubic-inch six with automatic remained standard, but the 360-cubic-inch became the only V8 option. Production for this final year was 2,006 coupes.

Motor Trend magazine road tested a 1977 Barcelona II coupe and found it to be equal to all in the objective areas, as well as one of the most distinctive vehicles on the road that "makes a good deal of sense... if you're not put off by the Matador's unique lines."

NASCAR racing 

Penske Racing prepared factory-backed Matador hardtops and coupes that were used on NASCAR stock car tracks. Drivers included Indy winners Mark Donohue and Bobby Allison, and they won several races.

As it was AMC's first entry into NASCAR since the Hudson Hornet of predecessor company Hudson, the company's effort "raised eyebrows" for many NASCAR veterans because AMC was not known for cultivating a racing image. Racing pundits "initially scoffed at the notion of an AMC entry" on the circuit, but "the Matador acquired a fan following of its own."

Hutcherson-Pagan built a pair of 1972 two-door hardtop "Bull Fighters" for Penske as the marque's first attempt at NASCAR in 1972. The Matador was one of the first oval stock cars to use disc brakes. After Donohue won the Western 500 with the first-generation Matador hardtop with four-wheel discs, other teams soon followed with the braking upgrade.

The new 1974 coupe replaced the previous "flying brick" two-door hardtop design. Penske was quoted as saying that they did what they could with the old hardtop, and it did better on tracks with more curves and fewer straightaways. Donohue did not survive to drive the new aerodynamically designed fastback coupe, that many believe was aimed at NASCAR racing. The five wins for the AMC Matador are:
 Winston Western 500 – Riverside – Mark Donohue – 21 January 1973
 Los Angeles Times 500 – Ontario – Bobby Allison – 24 November 1974
 Winston Western 500 – Riverside – Bobby Allison – 19 January 1975
 Rebel 500 – Darlington – Bobby Allison – 13 April 1975
 Southern 500 – Darlington – Bobby Allison – 1 September 1975

Bobby Allison also won the non-points Daytona 125 qualifying race on 13 February 1975 and finished second in the Daytona 500 three days later.

Police and Law Enforcement 
Though the full-sized AMC Ambassador was also offered as a police car, the Matador would prove to be very popular. The largest user of Matador patrol cars was the Los Angeles Police Department (LAPD), primarily from 1972 until 1974. After extensive testing of the special police models offered by GM, Ford, and Chrysler, the LAPD chose the AMC Matador because they "out handled and outperformed all the other cars." The LAPD police Matadors included among other special equipment: T-2 can lights, a five-channel Motorola Mocom 70 VHF radio, a Federal PA-20A Interceptor siren, and a "Hot Sheet Desk" with a Roster gooseneck lamp. Matador sedans and station wagons were also used by other agencies, including the Los Angeles Sheriffs Department, and the Los Angeles Fire Department. The 1974 models would be the last year for the LAPD's purchase of the Matador. The second-generation longer-nosed restyle and the -mile bumpers added weight that affected handling and performance. Moreover, after 1976, AMC "let the police car business go as it causes too many problems."

Matadors were used by many other law enforcement agencies across the U.S. and Canada, as well as by military police units with some remaining in service even until the mid-1980s.

While V8 power was down for many domestic sedans, AMC used a  V8 engine that out-powered most other police vehicles. Tests of the 1972 AMC Javelin pony car and Matador sedan equipped with the 401 V8s resulted in both running the quarter-mile dragstrip in the 14.7-second range. 0 to  times were within 7 seconds, comparable to a 2006 Hemi Charger police car.

The high-performance 401 V8 was last available in 1975 only for fleet- and police-ordered sedans.

In popular culture

Television shows

During the 1970s, AMC Matador police cars would appear in many television shows and episodes featuring police car procedures. The vehicle itself was considered a character most famously in Adam-12 from 1972 until the show's end in 1975. The show's stars rode in a 1972 Matador and the character of "Mac", their division sergeant, drove a 1972 Matador station wagon. In the sixth season the character of Officer Peter Malloy bought a 1974 Matador coupe as his own personal car and the car was featured in a few episodes thereafter. 

Adam-12's spin-off show, Emergency! featured Matadors as Los Angeles County Fire Department Fire command vehicles and as Police vehicles throughout the series. 

1974 Matador sedans were the Hazzard County, Georgia police cars featured during the first season of The Dukes of Hazzard. In further seasons fictitious Government agencies such as the "Tri-Counties Bonding Company" often drove Matadors, as did villains in some episodes. 

Both generations of sedans appeared as Police cars during the first three seasons of The Rockford Files. 

Both first and second generation Matadors appeared often as Police cars in The Incredible Hulk.

American Motors was a sponsor of the TV show Wonder Woman in later seasons and as a result, AMC cars were often used by characters or seen as background cars. Wonder Woman's personal car was a 1978 Concord AMX, and Colonel Steve Trevor drove a 1978 Matador Barcelona sedan in some episodes.

James Bond film placement
As part of a significant product placement strategy, an AMC Matador coupe played a starring role in The Man with the Golden Gun, released in 1974. It featured the newly introduced Matador Brougham Coupe in the Oleg Cassini edition, along with several Matador four-door police cars (in the black and white livery used by the Los Angeles Police Department), and a Hornet X hatchback. The Matador is the car of Francisco Scaramanga, and along with Nick Nack, they use the "flying" AMC Matador to kidnap Mary Goodnight. A stuntman drove the "car plane" to a runway. It was not airworthy, so a -long remote controlled model, built by John Stears, was used for the aerial sequences.

The "flying AMC Matador" was exhibited at auto shows, part of AMC's marketing efforts for the aerodynamically designed coupe, as well as publicity exposure for the concept of unique flying machines.

International production

Australia

Australian assembly of the Matador by Australian Motor Industries (AMI) started in 1971, and ceased at the end of 1976. The last models were sold in 1977. The AMI cars were marketed as the Rambler Matador. AMI also acted as the State distributor for Victoria. Sales for New South Wales were managed by Sydney company Grenville Motors Pty Ltd, which was also the State distributor of Rover and Land Rover. A network of Sydney and country NSW dealers were controlled by Grenville which was in direct communication with AMI. Australian Capital Territory sales were managed by Betterview Pty Ltd in Canberra. Annand & Thompson Pty Ltd in Brisbane distributed Rambler vehicles for Queensland. South Australian sales were managed by Champions Pty Ltd in Adelaide. Premier Motors Pty Ltd in Perth distributed Ramblers for Western Australia, and Heathco Motors in Launceston distributed Rambler vehicles for Tasmania.

Knock-down kits for right-hand drive models were shipped from AMC's Kenosha, Wisconsin factory for assembly in AMI's facilities in Port Melbourne, Victoria. AMI used the same paint codes for the Matadors as the Toyota and Triumph vehicles they also assembled. These paint codes did not correspond to the AMC paint codes and thus Australian Matador colors are unique. All exterior model year changes otherwise corresponded to those of U.S. production. However, Australian production of each model was carried through to the following year, and the final first-generation 1973 model was further assembled through to the end of 1975. The U.S 1974 second-generation Matador was assembled in Australia from December 1975 to December 1976. The Matador coupe was assembled in 1976 and sold in 1977 only.

Standard equipment included automatic transmission, power steering, power windows, locally fitted under dash air conditioning, and an AM radio, for both sedan and wagon models. The engine was AMC's  V8, following its introduction in the 1970 Rebel. Although superseded by AMC in the United States, Australian Matadors continued to be built with the heavier duty steering components used in Ramblers built with power steering up until 1967.

Among the options were an exterior mounted sun visor, vinyl roof cover, tow hitch, and mud flaps. The cars were targeted at the top market segment and advertised as "the American luxury limousine made for Australians" and built for Australian conditions.

Along with the vehicle modifications needed for Australian standards and market requirements, changes included the use of locally-sourced parts and components such as seats; carpeting; headlamps; side-view mirrors; heaters, and unique "R"-logo wheel covers). In accordance with Australia's local-content laws, this Australian-sourced componentry reduced the tariff added to each car. 

American-type red rear turn signals were prohibited in Australia starting in 1959, so Matador sedans had amber lenses in place of the clear reversing lens portion of the tail light assembly; these served as combination turn signal/back-up lights. Matador station wagons had amber add-on lights retrofitted into the tailgate. As with its Rebel predecessor, the Matador hardtops were not marketed in Australia. AMI's two-door offering was instead the Rambler Javelin.

1971

From late 1971, the AMI-built Matador was available in sedan and wagon body styles. (AMI had assembled the 1970 Rebel again in 1971, thereby causing the Matador's release to be a year late.) The sedan sold for AU$ 6,395 and the wagon sold for AU$ 7,395. 

As with the previous Australian-assembled Rebel models, the AMI-assembled Matador continued to use the dash of the U.S. 1967 Rambler Ambassador first used in the right-hand drive Ambassadors produced for the United States Postal Service in 1967, including the three-lever Weather Eye heater unit and analog clock to the left of the instrument fascia. The black, round instrument dials of the U.S 1970 Ambassador were also reused. A black metal plate with a picture of a bull and a bullfighter covered the cavity to the right side of the fascia where otherwise the radio went on U.S models. An AM radio unit was instead fitted into the center of the dash, above the ashtray.

Locally-sourced air conditioning included an under-dash evaporator unit.

Seating for the 1971 model consisted of a locally-made full bench seat, in vinyl, with a fold-down center armrest for both front and rear seats and headrests for the front.

Interior door panels were locally made in the style of the U.S model but with cutouts to accommodate the right-hand drive positioning of the power window controls (from the U.S AMC Ambassador), and the rear door panels came standard with ashtrays.

Interior color choices were crimson, black, cream, or brown, although all plastic trim, the dash, steering column, and steering wheel were only ever black.

The lighting system was modified to meet Australian regulations: The front turn signals used clear lenses rather than the U.S. amber ones; the front and rear side marker lights were amber rather than amber front/red rear as in the U.S. model, and the inner taillights were fitted with amber lenses and used as combination turn signal/back-up lights.

The Australian Matador also came with unique "R" logo hub caps which were locally made. The full-sized stainless steel hubcaps with the writing "American Motors" which were used in the U.S and New Zealand 1970 Rebel and U.S 1971 Matador were never available as an option in Australia. Apart from the hubcaps, externally the 1971 Australian Matador was the same as the U.S 1971 model.

Unlike the U.S models, Australian Matadors came standard with power steering, power windows and continued to use the earlier steering componentry of the mid-1960s U.S Ramblers.

Despite their right-hand drive, the Australian Matadors retained the left-sweep windshield wipers.

A total of 69 Matador sedans and 64 station wagons (including some 1970 Rebel station wagons reassembled in 1971) were sold in Australia in 1971.

1972

AMI continued to assemble the U.S 1971 model through 1972 and marketing it as a "1972" model. The actual U.S 1972 Matador was assembled by AMI  from July 1972 with wagons assembled from November 1972.

As with the U.S. model, the Australian 1972 model came with the new Torqueflite 727 transmission and the new-for-1972 external style changes.

The black instrument dials of the U.S. 1970 Ambassador were again reused in the RHD 1967 Ambassador dash. The revised armrests of the U.S. 1972 model were consistent with the Australian 1972 model. The front bench seats were again locally made featuring individually reclinable driver and passenger seatbacks and a fold-down middle armrest. The rear seat was the same as the 1971 Australian model. The same door panels from the 1971 model were reused and again made locally, also allowing for the RHD power window controls.

To comply with the Australian requirement for amber rear turn signals, the backup light lenses were changed from clear to amber on the sedans, and the lights were wired as combination turn signal/backup lights. Station wagons received amber turn signals attached to the tailgate. Front turn signal lenses on all models were clear. 

The Australian "R" hub caps were reused for the 1972 model.

Power windows, power antenna, under-dash air conditioning, and earlier Rambler steering componentry remained standard.

300 Matadors (236 sedans, 64 wagons) were sold in 1972, most being U.S. 1971 models.

1973
The U.S. 1972 model was further assembled in 1973 and sold as a "1973" model. The U.S. 1973 model was assembled by AMI from October 1973. Externally the Australian 1973 model was identical to the U.S. 1973 model, with the same grill and taillight changes. Again the models were built with the earlier Rambler heavier-duty steering components and heavy-duty suspension.

AMI boasted the new model's 11.4% increase in brake horsepower and a 3.5% increase in torque, despite a slew of anti-pollution equipment. A four-barrel carburetor replaced the two-barrel carburetor used up until this time.

For 1973, as amber front turn signals were adopted in Australia, AMI discontinued the transparent parking light/turn signal lenses. 

From 1973, Matadors were fitted with Australian-made front vinyl upholstered 50–50 split bench seats, each with fold-down armrests and headrests. The new headrests were slimmer than the 1971 and 1972 models. The rear bench seat remained the same. The locally-made door panels first used in the Australian 1971 model were continued, unchanged.

A slight change was made to the passenger side of the dash from the 1973 model onwards in that the 1967 Ambassador flat dash pad was replaced with a more protruding dash pad that ran flush with the instrument cluster binnacle and without the speaker. Speakers were instead fitted into both front door panels. Otherwise, the dash was the same as previous models but new for 1973 was the introduction of the white-backed instrument cluster of the U.S 1972/1973 Matador, displaying in miles per hour.

Power windows, power steering, under-dash air conditioning, and electric aerial remained standard.

For 1973, Australian sales were 230 Matadors (191 sedans, 39 wagons.) Most were U.S. 1972 models.

1974
For 1974 AMI continued to assemble the U.S 1973 model again, marketing it as a "1974" model.

Changes for the year included the introduction of white instrument dials (in use on the U.S models since 1972) now displaying kilometers per hour (km/h.) The horn pad and steering wheel of the U.S 1973 Matador (without "bullseye" logo) were replaced with the slightly smaller steering wheel and interchangeable horn pad of the AMC Hornet (with the "AMC" logo in the center.) Also for 1974 three-point retractable seat belts for the front and rear were fitted, replacing the two-point sash belts. The locally-made, split-bench front seat and rear seat from the 1973 model carried over, as did the locally-made door panels copied from the U.S 1971 model.

Right-hand sweep windshield wipers were finally added.

145 Matadors (118 sedans, 27 wagons) were sold in Australia during 1974. All were U.S. 1973 models.

1975
For 1975 AMI continued to assemble the U.S. 1973 model, marketing it as a "1975" model. All the standard features of the original U.S. 1973 model and local year-by-year changes were retained.

Assembly of the second-generation Matador sedan and wagon released in the United States in 1974 was held off in Australia until December 1975.

Registrations for 1975 were 118 Matadors (85 sedans, 33 wagons) including the first few of the second-generation models assembled at the end of 1975.

1976

AMI assembled the U.S. 1974 second-generation Matador sedan and wagon through 1976 marketing it as the new "1976" model. The first few were built in December 1975. The new Matador was priced at $9,810 for the sedan and $10,951 for the station wagon.

Externally it was identical to the U.S 1974 model, even using the U.S stainless steel, full-size hub caps in use by AMC since 1972, but for the first time in Australia.

As with the previous models, the 1967 Rambler Ambassador dash assembly was reused, but now fitted with the 1974 U.S., three-pod instrument cluster. The 1967 Ambassador Weather Eye unit, previously positioned to the left of the instrument dials since the Rebel was this time shifted to the right of the dials. The new foam-formed cluster fascia encompassed all but the levers of the unit. The Australian-made seats in use since the 1973 model and the locally-made door cards in use since the 1971 model were continued with no changes. The revised steering wheel with the rectangular horn pad of the 1974 U.S.-version was used on Australian models until the end of production.

All Australian second-generation Matadors continued to be powered with the AMC 360 V8 engine with automatic transmission, as with the first-generation Australian-built Matadors. From about June 1976, AMI fitted the Matador sedans with a "Heavy Duty Fleet Engine." As explained in Rambler Automotive Technical Service sheet #157, dated November 1976, the engines came with a four-barrel carburetor and electronic ignition. There were no other engine or transmission options.

The hood latch on the second-generation Australian Matadors remained on the passenger (left) side of the cabin, whereas previous Australian Matadors had the bonnet latch on the driver's (right) side as would be expected on a right-hand drive vehicle.

Under-dash air conditioning, power windows, electric aerial, and the 1960s steering componentry remained standard.

Australian license plates are wider than U.S. plates, so a sheet of folded steel was welded to the rear of the license plate area of the body for the Australian plate to be affixed.

Documented registrations in 1976 were 88 Matadors (78 sedans, 10 wagons),

1977
A small number of Matadors which were assembled in December 1976 were registered in 1977.

Documented registrations for 1977 were 27 Matadors (24 sedans and 3 wagons.)

Production Number Discrepancies
The official registration figures of Australian second-generation Matador sedans and wagons are at odds with the actual number of Matadors produced as there are known models with body numbers in the 200s and 300s despite registrations supposedly totaling 102 sedans and 13 wagons. Additionally, the document put out by AMI in November 1976 about the fitting of heavy-duty fleet engines to Matadors states "the engines have been fitted in numerical sequence from Body number 180 to Body number 248 and are matched to engine numbers A1221PF to A1289PF.” Those with the fleet engines were built in June 1976. Matadors continued to be built until December 1976.

Aficionados from The AMC and Rambler Club of Australia (Victoria) and The Hudson-AMC Car Club of Australia (New South Wales) have determined that in actual fact 320 Matador sedans and 60 Matador wagons were built by AMI in Australia between December 1975 and December 1976. The reason for the misreporting has been attributed to new Matadors having been registered as "Other" instead of "Rambler" at the time of first registration.

Matador Coupe

A fully imported AMC Matador X Coupe was presented at the Melbourne International Motor Show in 1974 to gauge interest. The evaluation car was converted from left-hand-drive to right-hand-drive by an outside company for the show. AMI dealers announced that there would only be 80 assembled for the Australian market. One media outlet reporting on the show stated that "As an indication that U.S cars are now very passe, most showgoers drifted by with hardly a glance for the car, preferring to paw over the bread-and-butter Toyota range." Other media reports were more positive, stating that they expected the model to sell out quickly.

Although AMI received 160 knock-down kits for the all-new Matador Coupe in 1974, AMI did not assemble them until late 1976. By the mid-1970s AMI was more focused on producing Toyotas and did not want to assemble the Matador coupes. The knock-down kits were purposefully left out in the elements for many months in the hope of achieving an insurance write-off. However, when it came to the claim, Loss assessors adjudicated that 90 of the cars were still salvageable. Of the 160 cars, 70 were destroyed, 80 were assembled, and 10 were held as parts.

Priced at $11,986 the model was marketed through 1977, and sold for one year only. Australian models came with AMC's 360 cu-in V8 with three-speed automatic transmission, the U.S Matador X sports steering wheel, and bucket seats. Air conditioning, electric antenna, and AM/FM radio were all standard. Because of the low production numbers (under 100) AMI was able to avoid having to re-engineer the left-hand drive wiper sweep to right-hand drive as they had done on the Matador sedans and wagons after 1974. All Australian models were badged as the sportier Matador X.

As with all factory RHD export and kit-assembled RHD Rebel and Matador sedans and wagons, the Australian Matador coupe used the dash of the 1967 Rambler Ambassador, although the instrument dials, center column, and steering wheel were from the U.S. 1974 model. Again, to satisfy Australian design rules, the red rear turn signal lenses were replaced with an off-the-shelf round orange lens replacing the inner tail light and rewired to flash amber, leaving the outer lens as tail light and brake light.

Costa Rica 
Purdy Motor in San Jose assembled Matadors in Costa Rica from knock-down kits.

Purdy Motor had acquired the franchise rights to market American Motors vehicles in 1959 and had imported complete cars to Costa Rica, but it was not until 1964 that Costa Rican laws permitted the local assembly of vehicles. Purdy Motor built an assembly plant in 1965 and the first locally manufactured Rambler was a 1964 Rambler Classic 660 which came off the line in late 1965. The all-new 1967 Rebel was assembled to production end, followed by the Matador from 1971.

In 1974 a new local vehicle manufacturer, Motorizada de Costa Rica, purchased the rights of Rambler distributorship from Purdy Motor. Motorizada continued to assemble AMC and Jeep vehicles as well as other brands until 1978. Motorizada was liquidated in 1979 allegedly for not paying taxes thereby ending the AMC brand in Costa Rica.

As with other export markets, the Matador was marketed in Costa Rica under the Rambler marque even after the marque was retired by AMC in its home market after 1969.

Mexico
Matadors were built by Vehículos Automotores Mexicanos (VAM) in Mexico.

First generation

1971
Continuing the concept of VAM's version of the AMC Rebel, the Mexican Matadors were only available as a single trim level and in four-door sedan and two-door hardtop forms in their initial year. The hardtop retained the Rambler Classic SST name while the four-door sedan changed from Rambler Classic 770 to Rambler Classic DPL. Both body styles saw the same features as the 1971 AMC Matadors and were almost equal with only a few exclusive characteristics for each. Standard equipment consisted of four-wheel manual drum brakes, manual steering,  gross at 4,600 rpm  I6 engine with Carter WCD two-barrel carburetor and 9.5:1 compression ratio, fully synchronized three-speed manual transmission with column shift, 10-inch heavy-duty clutch, 3.54:1 rear differential gear ratio with manual transmission, 3.07:1 rear differential gear ratio with automatic transmission, electric two-speed wipers, electric washers, rectangular full-length  speedometer, electric analog clock, collapsible steering column with built-in ignition switch, luxury custom steering wheel, courtesy lights, cigarette lighter, dashboard ashtray, locking glove box, wide individual front seats (hardtop), front bench seat (sedan), two-point front seatbelts, front and rear side armrests, dual rear ashtrays, single round dome light (sedan), dual C-pillar dome lights (hardtop), dual coat hooks, bright molding package, luxury wheel covers, and driver's side remote mirror. Optional equipment included power drum brakes (standard with automatic transmission), power steering, heavy-duty suspension, automatic transmission, heater with front defroster, vinyl roof, remote-controlled driver's side mirror, passenger's side remote mirror, bumper guards, bumper tubes, and locking gas cap.

1972
For 1972, all VAM cars received the same revisions and improvements as the AMC-built models. Power brakes with front disks became standard equipment regardless of transmission, a Chrysler A998 three-speed automatic transmission in place of the older Borg-Warner automatics, heavy-duty suspension with front sway bar, improved heater with revised controls placed to the right of the steering column, and new two-round-pod instrument cluster. New wheel cover and grille designs were noticeable on the exterior, while seat patterns and side panels were also updated.

Since its redesign in 1970, the hardtop body style started to drop in sales and the front-end facelift of 1971 did not help to reverse the trend. VAM did not want to drop it thereby leaving the company without a mid-sized two-door offering.

The model was reworked into an all-new limited edition with a sportier focus for 1972, as well as featuring more appointments similar to a personal luxury car. This became the VAM Classic Brougham, with the name "Rambler" removed to rejuvenate the line, while the four-door sedan became the VAM Classic DPL. The Brougham included as standard equipment power steering, three-speed automatic transmission with a floor-mounted shifter (the same unit as the U.S. Rebel Machine models), a center console with locking compartment (also shared with the Rebel Machine), individual high-back bucket seats (shared with the VAM Javelin), bright trim for pedals, heater, AM/FM stereo radio with four speakers, tinted windshield, and a remote-controlled driver's side remote mirror.

Despite the marketing and high level of equipment, the public saw it as the previous model. The only external differences with the previous model were limited to the colors, the grille, the standard vinyl roof, and the wheel covers. The price was higher than that of the Rambler Classic SST and it did not increase sales for the year, ending below VAM's expectations.

The VAM Classic Brougham is the closest Mexican equivalent to AMC models Rebel Machine and Go Package-equipped Matador sold in the U.S. and Canada and is probably the most collectible Matador/Rebel model produced in Mexico.

1973
Because of the low sales of the Classic Brougham hardtop, the Classic DPL four-door sedan became the only Matador version produced by VAM for 1973, with Javelin being the largest two-door model offered by the company. The 1973 Classic DPLs were virtually the same as their previous year's counterparts with differences only in the seat and side panel designs as well as the grille design and a new engine head with larger valves and independent rockers.

Second generation

1974
The generational change that AMC Matadors received for 1974 in the United States was also introduced in Mexico. This meant a new front-end design with the "coffin nose" elongated central portion and single headlights, new horizontal tail light designs, and rear license plate mount located on the rear panel instead of the bumper as well as a new dashboard with squared dials and full length padded surface. With these novelties also came new bumper designs characterized by the five-mile-per-hour impact absorption system. This meant the only case (alongside the Pacer) of a VAM car incorporating this safety measure, which was not mandated by the Mexican government; making VAM Classics exceed the safety regulations of its time. Sedan units ordered with the automatic transmission regularly also included the power steering system and a heater at no extra cost. The beginning of automotive engine emission certification in Mexico affected the  six, which changed to a lower 8.5:1 compression ratio.

Matador Coupe
The biggest news of the year was the arrival of a new two-door model, AMC's Matador coupe. Unlike all previous (Matador and Rebel) models, it was available in two different trim levels; the sporty Classic AMX equivalent to the AMC Matador X model and the luxury Classic Brougham equivalent to the AMC Matador Brougham coupe model. Both versions were mechanically the same, carrying the same technical specifications as the Classic DPL models. Their main differences relied on appearance and standard features. The Classic AMX sported VAM's in-house five-spoke wheels with volcano center caps and trim rings, a blacked-out grille, and a rally stripe surrounding the full length of the car with an integrated AMX emblem on the right corner of the trunk lid; the Classic Brougham had a standard vinyl roof cover with its respective moldings, wheel covers (new design for the year), standard grille and "Brougham" emblems over the C-pillar bases. The Classic AMX showcased a three-spoke sports steering wheel, high-back fold-down individual bucket seats, a center console with a locking compartment, a floor-mounted gearshift, and AM/FM radio. Despite the sportiness of the model, intended to take the place of the Javelin as VAM's top-of-the-line performance model as well as the image and enthusiast builder. The side armrests were the standard designs used in the Matador base models of the U.S. On the other hand, the Classic Brougham sported a custom sports steering wheel and column-mounted shifter with a fold-down split-back bench seat and AM radio. Unlike the Classic DPL, both the Classic AMX and the Classic Brougham included automatic transmission, power steering, and heater as standard equipment. A unique characteristic of the 1974 VAM Classic AMX was the shifter because it was the Javelin's "aircraft" U-shaped design.

1975
For 1975, changes in all three versions were few.

The Classic DPL obtained the new one-piece grille design with rectangular parking lights, following the US-made versions, as well as featuring new seats and door panels. The luxury steering wheel gained a new design for both the Classic DPL and the Classic Brougham.

Both coupe models obtained new interior door panels with AMC's full-length X-model side armrests; the panels of the sports version also carried an etched "AMX" emblem over the vinyl near the top front corner of the door. The Classic AMX also featured AMC's X-model floor-mounted shifter design.

All three versions shared the upgrades of electronic ignition, a vacuum gauge in place of the electric clock, a  I6 with a lower 7.7:1 compression ratio, and Holley 2300 two-barrel carburetor. The rear differential gear ratio was changed to 3.31:1 for both transmissions. A major update was present at the front of the engine. The positions of the steering pump and the alternator were reversed, the former now being placed at the intakes' side and the latter at the distributor's one. This also meant a new water pump model for the 282 six.

1976
Additional changes were incorporated for the 1976 model year. The Classic DPL and Brougham featured a new design for wheel covers. Both coupe models obtained a new grille design divided into two portions with squared parking lights. The Classic AMX had a new and more discreet side decal covering only the front fenders. It started near the A-pillar running to the top of the side marker light in two tones, with a painted "AMX" emblem on it. The loss of the rear portion of the side decal meant a new metal "AMX" emblem on the right trunk lid corner. Unlike previous years, the 1976 Classic AMX had a more blurred line between a sporty model and a luxury one. The side panel designs and seats looked luxurious instead of sporty, several units had wheel covers as standard instead of the trim rings and regular hubcaps, and some units also had the clock instead of the vacuum gauge. What made them sporty was mostly reduced to the side armrests, steering wheel, individual seat configuration, floor-mounted shifter, and a center console. All three versions shared a new 160 km/h speedometer, tinted windshield, and seat designs that were based on AMC's Oleg Cassini units for the Matador coupes. These were color-keyed with the rest of the interior and shared by all three versions instead of just the Brougham coupe as under AMC. The most unusual ones were those of the AMX as they were individual and included adjustable headrests with integrated Cassini crests and reclining mechanisms (for the first time in VAM cars since 1972). The Classic DPL sported a fixed front bench seat while the Classic Brougham held a split folding-back bench. This model (as well as the 1976 VAM Pacer) is the only case of a VAM car that came close to the various U.S. AMC designer cars. This interior design was not an optional package, but a standard factory feature. The copper accents (except for the buttons) and the exterior trim of the AMC Oleg Cassini models were not used in the VAM Classics (and Pacers). Meaning the Mexican Cassini package was mostly focused on seat and side panel designs (interior only).

The Classic line was discontinued in the middle of the 1976 model year. VAM was looking forward to introducing the Pacer model to the Mexican market, which would represent its fourth product line, while Mexican legislation at the time allowed only three per marque. Having both the Classic and the Pacer in the luxury market segment would have also caused internal competition. VAM favored the new Pacer over what until that time had been its flagship model (Ambassador in the US). There were also external factors behind this decision, since the large car market was going through a general downturn in Mexico. Starting in 1977, VAM's most luxurious model was the Pacer, and its largest sized models were the Americans (AMC Hornets).

International exports

Canada
Although AMC's Brampton Assembly Plant in Ontario, Canada had been building Rambler and AMC vehicles since 1962, including the Ambassador (until 1968) and Rebel, the plant did not build the almost-identical Matador which replaced the Rebel, despite also building AMC's Hornet, Gremlin, and later Concord and Jeep through the 1970s. Canadian-market Matadors were instead built at Kenosha and exported to Canada from the United States. Despite this, some parts used in the U.S. and foreign-built Matadors, notably tail light and park light lenses were made in Canada.

Finland
Rambler and AMC vehicles were imported from Kenosha into Finland by two major Finnish companies from the 1950s until the late 1960s after which Wihuri Group, a large multi-sector family business, took over import operations using its shipping operation, Autola Oy which Wihuri had brought in 1954. First and second-generation Matadors were imported along with Hornet and Javelin. As with all AMC export markets the models were marketed as "Rambler" in Finland. Imports of the Matador continued until 1975.

Norway
Matadors were imported into Norway during the 1970s by Norwegian importer Kolberg & Caspary AS located at Ås, Norway. Kolberg & Caspary was formed in 1906 and imported automotive, industrial, and construction products.

Matadors, Javelins, and Hornets were sold by Gavas Motors AS in Oslo and Hasco Motors AS in Drammen.

United Kingdom
The Rambler name was used on right hand drive Matador models sold in the UK. Matador sedans were available through Rambler Motors (A.M.C) Limited in Chiswick, West London alongside the Ambassador hardtop and station wagon, and Javelin. Except for the Javelin, both the Matador and Ambassador models were exported from Kenosha with factory right-hand drive, as had been with the prior Rebel and Ambassador models imported into the U.K. None were locally assembled.

Unlike the Knock-down kits used for Australian assembly which continued to use the RHD version of the 1967 Ambassador dash, cluster, and Weather Eye (albeit to the right of the cluster for the second-generation models), U.K. second-generation Matadors were factory-built with the temperature controls of the US-versions (positioned underneath and to the left of the instrument dials.) U.K. models also received a locally built and fitted "walnut burr" fascia that replaced the AMC black plastic cluster surround, as had been the practice for previous U.K.-market Rebels and Ambassadors.

The final 1977 models for the U.K. market were regular LHD versions.

Discontinuation 
During the late 1970s, the domestic automobile market was moving to smaller cars. The large-sized Matador was no longer attractive to customers demanding more economical cars as fuel and money became increasingly worrisome problems after the 1973 oil crisis and the continuing double-digit domestic inflation.

Lacking the financial resources for a full redesign, AMC dropped the large Ambassador after 1974, while the Matador was discontinued after 1978, around the same time as Ford moved their full-size nameplates to a smaller platform. The downsized 1977 Chevrolet Impala also spelled doom for large intermediates from AMC and Chrysler. American Motors responded to the declining demand for large cars by introducing a new nameplate in 1978, the AMC Concord. The Concord was an upmarket restyling and positioning of the compact AMC Hornet that had the same  wheelbase as the redesigned intermediate 1978 Chevrolet Malibu. It was presented as combining an "easy-to-handle size with a roomy sumptuous interior" and in contrast to the Matador coupe, the "overall styling was pleasant ... would not offend anyone" This was the first full-line of economical, compact-sized cars with luxurious trim, features, and comfort levels previously available only in larger automobiles.

American Motors did not have another large car until the Eagle Premier that was developed with Renault's partnership and introduced to the marketplace following the purchase of AMC by Chrysler in 1987.

Collectability 

While well-restored examples of Matador sedans can still be purchased for under US$3,000, ads have been published asking over US$10,000 for restored coupes. In Australia, a "survivor" or restored Matador sedan can fetch between AU$10,000–14,000.

Hemmings Classic Car magazine listed the 1974–78 Matador Coupe as one of their 19 pieces of rolling proof that the old-car hobby need not be expensive and described the Coupe as "possibly one of the most distinctive shapes to come out of the 1970s, and arguably a style pinnacle for the personal luxury movement", the James Bond movie role, as well as its NASCAR history.

The 1991 Esquire article "Cool Cars Nobody Wants" describes the 1974–75 AMC Matadors as a collectible, stating: "long considered the automaker to geeks, American Motors began its slow decline, we believe, when the liberal do-gooders who made up its core market began earning enough money to buy Scandinavian cars."

In 2014, Hagerty collector insurance listed the Adam 12 AMC Matador as their number one "favorite full-size, rear-wheel-drive American cop cars from 60 years of the best cop shows."

References

Further reading

External links 

 AMC Matador on fastmusclecar.com
 The Coupe Coop, a website dedicated to the Matador coupe
 (Archived) MatadorSedan.com
 (Archived) Vintage LAPD Matador
 (Archived) AMC Police Car Registry
 (Archived 2009–10–24) Matador racing history
 
 AMC Rambler Club — Club for 1954 – 1988 AMCs.
 American Motors Owners — Club for 1958 – 1988 AMCs.

Matador
Mid-size cars
Full-size vehicles
Muscle cars
Rear-wheel-drive vehicles
Coupés
Sedans
Station wagons
Police vehicles
Cars introduced in 1971
Adam-12